20 De Colección may refer to:

20 De Colección (Carlos Vives album), 1994
20 De Colección (Yolandita Monge album), 1993
20 De Colección, compilation album Mocedades
20 De Colección, compilation album Leo Dan
20 De Colección, compilation album Lorenzo de Monteclaro
20 De Colección, compilation album Tania Libertad